In clan of Yonan is one of the Korean clans. Their Bon-gwan is in Yonan County, Hwanghae Province. According to the research held in 2000, the number of In clan of Yonan’s members was 588. Their founder was  who was a Mongolian and worked as civil servant.  entered Goryeo as a fatherly master of Princess Jeguk who was a Kublai Khan’s daughter. The daughter had a marriage to an ordinary person planned by Chungnyeol of Goryeo.

See also 
 Korean clan names of foreign origin

References

External links